People's Encounter is a 1991 Indian Telugu-language film directed by Mohan Gandhi and starring Vinod Kumar and Bhanupriya. The film is based on the situations in Andhra Pradesh in the early 1990s. It was the debut film of Srikanth.

Plot 
At that time, the Peoples War Group (PWG), was an armed guerrilla army against the Government, who support the people who are needy and backwards. The struggle between Peoples War Group and the Government enabled forces like Law, Justice and Police to prevail. The movie was based on some true incidents that happened in the Andhra Pradesh..

Cast 
Vinod Kumar
Bhanupriya
Srikanth
Charan Raj
Gundu Hanumantha Rao
Chalapathi Rao
Annapoorna
Jayalalita
Mallikarjuna Rao
Nirmalamma
Paruchuri Venkateswara Rao
Y. Vijaya

Soundtrack 
The songs were composed my M. M. Keeravani.

References

External links 
 

1991 films
1990s Telugu-language films
Films scored by M. M. Keeravani